Francisco de Borja Álvarez de Toledo y Gonzaga, 12th Marquis of Villafranca (9 June 1763 – 12 February 1821) inherited the title of Marquis of Villafranca from his elder brother José Álvarez de Toledo, Duke of Alba in 1796, as well as 14th Marquis of Cazaza, 12th Duke of Bivona and 12th Marquis of Los Vélez.

He was married in Madrid, on 28 January 1798, to María Tomasa Palafox y Portocarrero (1780–1835), the daughter of Felipe Antonio de Palafox Croy and Maria Francisca de Sales de Guzmán, Grandee of Spain and Condesa de Montijo,  (1763–1821). They had six children, two girls and four boys, the eldest boy, Francisco, dying aged 16. Álvarez was succeeded by his second son, Pedro (1803–1867).

Ancestry

|-

1763 births
1821 deaths
116
109
Grandees of Spain
Francisco De Borja